Azure is an album by American flugelhornist Art Farmer and Austrian pianist Fritz Pauer featuring performances recorded in 1987 and released on the Soul Note label.

Reception

The Allmusic review called the album "A peaceful and mostly introspective release".

Track listing
 "If You Could See Me Now" (Tadd Dameron, Carl Sigman) - 4:32    
 "Nighttime" (Fritz Pauer) - 3:58    
 "Yesterday's Thoughts" (Benny Golson) - 4:56    
 "Blue Windows" (Traditional) - 3:19    
 "Azure" (Duke Ellington, Irving Mills) - 4:15    
 "Sound Within an Empty Room" (Pauer) - 6:13    
 "Soul Eyes" (Mal Waldron) - 4:22    
 "Danielle" (Al Cohn) - 4:17    
 "Song of Praise" (Pauer) - 4:03

Personnel
Art Farmer - flugelhorn
Fritz Pauer - piano

References

Black Saint/Soul Note albums
Art Farmer albums
1987 albums